Ronquils (sometimes spelt ronchils) is a small family marine ray-finned fish, the Bathymasteridae. These fishes are found only in Arctic and North Pacific waters. This family contains just seven species in three genera. The larger species are important to commercial fisheries as food fish. Ronquils are most closely related to the eelpouts and prowfish in the suborder Zoarcoidei of the order Scorpaeniformes.

Taxonomy
The Bathymasteridae was first proposed as a family in 1883 by the American ichthyologists David Starr Jordan and Charles Henry Gilbert. The 5th edition of Fishes of the World classifies this family within the suborder Zoarcoidei, within the order Scorpaeniformes. Other authorities classify this family in the infraorder Zoarcales wihin the suborder Cottoidei of the Perciformes because removing the Scorpaeniformes from the Perciformes renders that taxon non monophyletic. The monophyly of the Zoarcoidei has still not been fully ascertained but it is generally accepted that the most basal family is Bathymasteridae.

Etymology
The name ronquil is said to be an anglicization from the Spanish ronco, ronquillo being a diminutive, and which means “one who grunts”. The family name Bathymasteridae is derived from the type genus Bathymaster and this can be translated from the Greek to mean "deep searcher".

Genera
The ronquil family is divided into three genera as follows:

Characteristics
Ronquils have elongate with long dorsal and anal fins which are even in height along all of their length. These fins are separated from the large, truncate to round caudal fin by a clear caudal peduncle. There are between 43 and 49 branched and unbranched rays in the dorsal fin while the anal fin contains between 31 and 36 rays. These ray counts include between 1 and 6 weak, pliant to the front of the dorsal fin and 1 or 2 similar spines in the front of the anal fin. The pectoral fins are large and rounded while the  pelvic fins are located on the thorax, and have a single spine and 5 soft rays. There is a single pair of nostrils. The scales vary from weakly ctenoid, nearly smooth, to strongly ctenoid. There are sensory pores on the upper head of head and on the cheeks and these are obvious. The lateral line is clearly visible and runs on the upper body, straight to the rear of the dorsal fin, and has between 75 and 105 scales. The roof of the mouth has palatine and vomerine teeth. The bill membrane is separate from the isthmus, in most cases. There is no swim bladder. These fishes may be olive brown to dull red, bluish black, or purplish in their overall colour, they can be marked with bright green, blue, yellow, red, orange, and white bars, spots or other markings. The colour and patterns often vary between populations  or be an expression of sexual dimorphism.

Distribution, habitat and behaviour
Ronqulis inhabit cold waters in the North Pacific where they have a wide range from Baja California to the Sea of Japan,  ronquils are benthic animals, spending most of their time on or near the bottom.

Ronquils feed primarily on small benthic crustaceans and mollusks, and the stomachs of some specimens sampled contained only nudibranch]s. Little is known about predators of ronqulis but it is presumed that most larger carnivores that occur in the same areas as them, especially predatory fishes, will prey on them. Although considered fairly common, ronquils are rarely observed; this is likely owing to their secretive nature.

Few specifics are recorded regarding ronquil spawning, but the males are known to guard the brood. The males have been known to cannibalize some of the eggs they are guarding.

See also
List of fish common names
List of fish families

References

 
Zoarcoidei
Taxa named by David Starr Jordan
Taxa named by Charles Henry Gilbert